Palloptera is a genus of flutter flies in the family Pallopteridae. There are at least 30 described species in Palloptera.

Species
Approximately 33 species belong to the genus Palloptera:

P. albertensis 
P. ambusta 
P. anderssoni 
P. basimaculata 
P. bimaculata 
P. claripennis 
P. elegans 
P. ephippium 
P. flava 
P. formosa 
†P. hypolithica  (Burdigalian, China)
P. kloiberi 
P. kukumorensis 
P. laetabilis 
P. longipennis 
P. maculifemur 
P. marginata 
P. modesta 
†P. morticina  (Eocene, British Columbia)
P. orientata 
P. pallens 
P. quinquemaculata 
P. saltuum 
P. scutellata 
P. septentrionalis 
P. setosa 
P. subusta 
P. terminalis 
P. trimacula 
P. umbellatarum 
P. usta 
P. ustulata 
P. venusta

References

Further reading

External links

 

Pallopteridae
Articles created by Qbugbot
Tephritoidea genera
Taxa named by Carl Fredrik Fallén